Nuno Miguel do Adro Tomás (born 15 September 1995) is a Portuguese professional footballer who plays for Belenenses SAD as a central defender.

Club career

Belenenses
Born in Odivelas, Lisbon District, Tomás played youth football at local club C.F. Os Belenenses. In his first three years as a senior he was loaned to three teams in the third division, including Real S.C. who he helped gain promotion to the Segunda Liga for the first time ever.

After returning to the Estádio do Restelo for the 2017–18 season, Tomás made his Primeira Liga debut on 7 August 2017 in a 1–0 away loss against Rio Ave FC, starting and being directly involved in the opposition's goal. He scored twice in the following three league games, and on 14 September he renewed his contract until 2021.

CSKA Sofia
On 28 February 2019, Tomás was loaned to PFC CSKA Sofia of the First Professional Football League on a temporary deal with obligation to buy. In June, the Bulgarian club exercised that option.

Tomás also served a short loan at Finnish Veikkausliiga side Kuopion Palloseura.

Return to Portugal
On 19 August 2021, Tomás signed a two-year deal with Académico de Viseu F.C. as a free agent.

References

External links

Portuguese League profile 

1995 births
Living people
People from Odivelas
Sportspeople from Lisbon District
Portuguese footballers
Association football defenders
Primeira Liga players
Liga Portugal 2 players
Campeonato de Portugal (league) players
Odivelas F.C. players
C.F. Os Belenenses players
S.U. Sintrense players
Real S.C. players
Belenenses SAD players
Académico de Viseu F.C. players
First Professional Football League (Bulgaria) players
PFC CSKA Sofia players
Veikkausliiga players
Kuopion Palloseura players
Portugal youth international footballers
Portuguese expatriate footballers
Expatriate footballers in Bulgaria
Expatriate footballers in Finland
Portuguese expatriate sportspeople in Bulgaria
Portuguese expatriate sportspeople in Finland